Orchestra Iowa is an American symphony orchestra based in Cedar Rapids, Iowa. The current music director and conductor is Timothy Hankewich. Established in 1923 as the Cedar Rapids Symphony Orchestra, the orchestra has a full season, performing a fine arts series, a chamber series, a popular series, and performances with the Cedar Rapids Opera Theatre and Ballet Quad Cities. The orchestra principally performs at the Paramount Theatre located in downtown Cedar Rapids. They also perform regular concerts at Iowa City West High School and Brucemore. The chamber series is performed at the Coralville Center for the Performing Arts in Coralville, Iowa.

History
Orchestra Iowa began as the Cedar Rapids Symphony Orchestra. Its first concert was held on April 23, 1923 in the Sinclair Auditorium at Coe College. By 1928 the orchestra was playing its concerts at Veterans Memorial Coliseum. They continued playing during the Great Depression and World War II. It was not until the 1950s that the orchestra had a paid music director and began to pay the musicians.  A string quartet was established in the 1970s. By 1980 the orchestra moved to its current location at the Paramount Theatre. The orchestra has an outreach program to area students and the Orchestra Iowa School was begun in 1988 to teach string instrumentalists. An endowment program was begun in 1990.

In 2004 the administrative offices and the school moved to the new Symphony Center. It includes music studios and the Rockwell Collins Recital Hall. Orchestra Iowa has partnered with nationally syndicated From the Top radio program, Iowa Public Television, and Iowa Public Radio to bring symphonic music and music education programs to more people. The Symphony Center was extensively damaged in 2008 by the flooded Cedar River that submerged downtown Cedar Rapids. The orchestra had to perform in a variety of venues as a result. They will return to the Paramount Theatre for the 2012–2013 season.

Orchestra Iowa became the orchestra for the Cedar Rapids Opera Theatre in 2009. The Opus Concert Café, which opened in 2011, provides a space for chamber concerts and other performances.  With the 2012–2013 season they began a collaboration with Ballet Quad Cities. They perform with the ballet at both the Paramount Theatre in Cedar Rapids, and at the ballet's main performance venue the Adler Theatre in Davenport, Iowa.

Music Directors

Joseph H. Kitchen (1923–1952)
 Henry Denecke (1952–1970)
 Richard Williams (1970–1981)
 Christian Tiemeyer (1981–2006)
 Timothy Hankewich (2006–present)

References

External links
Orchestra Iowa, official site

1923 establishments in Iowa
Musical groups established in 1923
American orchestras
Tourist attractions in Cedar Rapids, Iowa
Culture of Cedar Rapids, Iowa
Performing arts in Iowa
Musical groups from Iowa